The Serbian Uprising of 1149 was instigated by the prince of Norman Sicily, Roger II, as a means to divert the resources of the Byzantine emperor Manuel I Komnenos during his campaign to reconquer the island of Corfu, which had been taken by the Normans the previous year.  

Serbian rebels first raided Byzantine territory in 1149, encouraged by Roger II, while Manuel was preoccupied with the Siege of Corfu. Manuel attempted to retaliate against the Serbs towards the end of the year, but was unable to engage them in open combat.  The following year, Manuel managed to reassert Byzantine authority in Serbia and Uroš II, the Grand Župan of Serbia, renewed his oath of servitude to Manuel.  

By 1154, however, Uroš had been ousted from power by his brother Desa, who was favored by the Kingdom of Hungary to rule Serbia. When Manuel arrived with his armies, both Uroš and Desa swore oaths of allegiance to him, and Manuel placed Uroš back on the throne as his vassal, ending the conflict.

References

Sources 
 

1150s conflicts
1150s in the Byzantine Empire
Wars involving the Byzantine Empire
Medieval Greece